Monella may refer to:

 35316 Monella, an asteroid
 Monella (film), a 1998 Italian comedy-erotic film